Josef Vacek (born 18 July 1900, date of death unknown) was a Czech weightlifter. He competed in the men's featherweight event at the 1928 Summer Olympics.

References

External links

1900 births
Year of death missing
Czech male weightlifters
Olympic weightlifters of Czechoslovakia
Weightlifters at the 1928 Summer Olympics
Place of birth missing